Bob Walliker (29 July 1922 – 18 December 2011) was  a former Australian rules footballer who played with Richmond in the Victorian Football League (VFL).

Notes

External links 
		

1922 births
2011 deaths
Australian rules footballers from Victoria (Australia)
Richmond Football Club players